Rachel Leighanne Tozier (born April 1, 1992) is an American sport shooter. She won the silver medal in the women's trap event at the 2019 Pan American Games held in Lima, Peru. She also won the silver medal in the mixed trap event together with Brian Burrows.

References

External links 
 

Living people
1992 births
Place of birth missing (living people)
American female sport shooters
Trap and double trap shooters
Pan American Games medalists in shooting
Pan American Games silver medalists for the United States
Shooters at the 2019 Pan American Games
Medalists at the 2019 Pan American Games
21st-century American women
20th-century American women